William Badger Tibbits (March 31, 1837 – February 10, 1880) was an officer in the Union Army during the American Civil War. He raised a company of infantry in the 2nd New York Infantry, and led it as captain, and later major, till 1863, when he was authorized to raise and lead a regiment of cavalry, the 21st New York Cavalry, and was promoted to colonel. He was brevetted major-general U.S.V., and finally promoted to full brigadier-general, in 1865.

Life 

William Badger Tibbits, the youngest son of George Mortimer Tibbits, was born at Hoosick, in Rensselaer County, New York, on March 31, 1837. His early youth was passed partly in Troy and partly in the country, and after having received elementary instruction at various schools, he graduated from Union college in 1859. He was engaged in business at Troy when, on the morning of April 15, 1861, news of the Rebellion starting in the South reached his ears. Heeding the Federal appeal, he at once left his office and obtained papers authorizing him to raise a company in a regiment which it was that day decided should be formed in Troy. He never returned to the business which he had abandoned, and in consequence of this abandonment the business proved to him a total loss.

His efforts as a soldier, from this point forward, were unwearied. He recruited more men for his company than any other person connected with it, and it was accepted, on April 23, 1861, as a part of the 2nd Regiment New York State Volunteers, with the following officers: Captain, William B. Tibbits; 1st Lieutenant, James Savage; 2nd Lieutenant, William Sullivan. The company was known as G company, and Tibbits was mustered into the service as captain on May 14, 1861. An idea of the nature of his services during the next seventeen months may be gained from the following recommendation:

This recommendation was duly honored by the State of New York, and Captain Tibbits was appointed major of the regiment, his commission bearing date October 13, 1862. The term of the 2nd Regiment expired in the following year, and on May 23, 1863, Major Tibbits was mustered out with the regiment, at the city of Troy. On June 17, 1863, he procured authorization papers to raise a cavalry regiment, to be known as the Griswold Light Cavalry, to serve for three years unless sooner discharged. The regiment received its name from the Hon. John A. Griswold, then the representative in Congress from the district embracing the city of Troy. About the time that the completion of the regiment was assured, a number of Major Tibbits' personal friends testified their appreciation of his bravery and merit by the gift of a sword, which bore the following inscriptions:

On January 1, 1864, Major Tibbits was mustered in as colonel of the 21st New York (Griswold Light) Cavalry, with rank as colonel from November 20, 1863. The first engagement in which the regiment took part was at New Market, Virginia, on Sunday, May 15, 1864. His services, performed early in the succeeding June, were acknowledged as follows:
For the two months following the battle of Piedmont his command was constantly employed. Labors performed and dangers undergone were recognised by his superiors. That such recognition was not lacking appears by the following communication:

On the receipt of this communication it was indorsed in these terms:

The general order referred to was as follows:

This recognition of the conduct of Colonel Tibbits was made still more complimentary by being read on dress-parade to each command in Hunter's army. On October 21, 1864, the regiment received from the Hon. John A. Griswold a stand of colors, the regulation-flag and the regimental standard, both being of heavy silk, and bearing appropriate devices and embellishments embroidered upon them. On November 17, 1864, Colonel Tibbits received an official communication from the War Department, conferring on him the designation of brevet brigadier-general, with rank from October 21, 1864. Not only did his services extend through the war, but after its conclusion he was ordered west, on the plains, and it was not until in September, 1865, that he received permission, while at Leavenworth, Kansas, to return to his home at Troy, and there await orders.

He received the rank of major-general U.S.V., by brevet, in March 1865, and was made a full brigadier-general on October 18, 1865. The following are the names of the places at which engagements occurred — all of them in Virginia — in which General Tibbits participated while in the cavalry service: New Market, Piedmont, Lynchburg, Hillsboro, Snicker's Gap, Ashby's Gap, Kearnestown, Winchester, Martinsburg, Charlestown, Halltown, Nineveh, Rood's Hill, and Liberty Mill or Gordonsville. He was mustered out under General Order No. 168, to date from January 15, 1866.

General Tibbits returned to Troy in 1866, where for several years afterwards he suffered greatly, resulting from injuries received while in the service. He died at his home in Troy on February 10, 1880, and was buried in Oakwood Cemetery.The will, admitted to probate on March 24, bequeathed $100,000 for the erection and maintenance of a home for indigent soldiers of the armies of the United States of the Civil War, and for indigent old men and women, who might be admitted if the house was not filled with soldiers. The gift was conditional upon the raising of $50,000 additional within five years, and the erection of the home, to be known as Tibbits Home, in or near Tibbets Avenue, in the city of Troy. The will also left $500 annually for five years to the Tibbits Veteran Corps, and the same amount to the Tibbits Cadets, and at the expiration of five years each company was set to receive $8,333.34. The Tibbits estate, left to four heirs, of whom General Tibbits was one, was the largest landed estate in the city, and had never been divided. It was estimated to amount to upward of $1,000,000.
Nathaniel Bartlett Sylvester, writing in 1880, makes the following appraisal of Tibbits: "a man whose sound judgment when advice was needed, whose bravery when fighting was to be done, and whose celerity in movement when action was required, won for him, in the stations which he filled, the reputation of being a skillful soldier, and, at the same time, one of the most intrepid spirits of the war."

References

Sources 

 Hoopes, Donelson F. (1966). "Alexander Pope, Painter of "Characteristic Pieces"". The Brooklyn Museum Annual, 8. pp. 129–146. 
 Sylvester, Nathaniel Bartlett (1880). History of Rensselaer Co., New York. Philadelphia: Everts & Peck. pp. 89, 192ɢ–192ʜ. 
 Warner, Ezra J. (1964). "William Badger Tibbits". Generals in Blue: Lives of the Union Commanders. Baton Rouge: Louisiana State University Press. pp. 505–506.
 Wilson, James Grant; Fiske, John, eds. (1889). "Tibbits, George". Appleton's Cyclopædia of American Biography. Vol. 6. New York: D. Appleton and Company. p. 110, col. 2.
 "Emblems of the Civil War". Brooklyn Museum. Retrieved March 12, 2023.
 "Founding a Soldiers' Home / The Bequests of the Late Gen. W. B. Tibbets". The New York Times. March 25, 1880. p. 1, col. 4.

External links 

 "21st Cavalry Regiment". New York State Military Museum and Veterans Research Center. Retrieved March 11, 2023.
 "William Badger Tibbits". Find a Grave. October 26, 2001. Retrieved March 11, 2023.
 "William Badger Tibbits". Rensselaer County / NYGenWeb. Retrieved March 11, 2023.

Union Army generals
1837 births
1880 deaths
Burials at Oakwood Cemetery (Troy, New York)